Susan Cheever (born July 31, 1943) is an American author and a prize-winning best-selling writer well known for her memoir, her writing about alcoholism, and her intimate understanding of American history. She is a recipient of the PEN New England Award. She currently teaches in the MFA program at The New School in New York City.

Biography

Cheever is the daughter of novelist John Cheever and poet/professor Mary Cheever. She has two brothers, Benjamin Cheever and the late Federico Cheever. Cheever has been married three times and divorced twice. Cheever married Robert Cowley, the son of Malcolm Cowley, in 1967. The couple divorced 8 years later. Cheever's second husband was Calvin Tomkins, II, whom she married in 1981. Cheever and Tomkins have a daughter Sarah. Cheever married her third husband, Warren James Hinckle III, in 1989.  Cheever and Hinckle have a son, Warren Hinckle IV, who was born in November 1989.

Career
Cheever's most recent book, published in 2015, is Drinking in America: Our Secret History. The book chronicles how alcohol has influenced the history of the United States. Her other books include My Name is Bill - Bill Wilson: His Life and the Creation of Alcoholics Anonymous, a biography of Alcoholics Anonymous cofounder Bill Wilson;  Home Before Dark, a memoir about her father, novelist John Cheever; Treetops: A Memoir; and five novels: Looking for Work, A Handsome Man, The Cage, Doctors and Women, and Elizabeth Cole. Her essay "Baby Battle," in which she describes immersion in early motherhood and subsequent phases of letting go of her primary identity as a mother, was included in the 2006 anthology Mommy Wars by Leslie Morgan Steiner. Her most recent biography, E.E. Cummings: A Life was reviewed in The New York Times, The New Yorker, and was selected as one of the best books of 2015 by The Economist ("With boundless new detail gathered through meticulous research, Susan Cheever succeeds where most other biographers have failed....") and The San Francisco Chronicle.

Cheever is the author of American Bloomsbury: Louisa May Alcott, Ralph Waldo Emerson, Margaret Fuller, Nathaniel Hawthorne, and Henry David Thoreau: Their Lives, Their Loves, Their Work, published in December 2006. Cheever was a Guggenheim Fellow in 1983.  She graduated from Brown University in 1965 and studied American Literature at New York University. She is also a member of the Corporation of Yaddo and serves on the Author's Guild Council. In addition to working on her books, she teaches in the Bennington College M.F.A. program and at The New School.

Cheever is the author of Desire: Where Sex Meets Addiction, which was published in 2008.

She is working on a book about her father's short stories.

Awards and honors

1985 L.L. Winship/PEN New England Award, Home Before Dark
1985 National Book Critics Circle Award, Nominee
1996 The Michael Q. Ford Journalism Award for her Newsday columns , Cheever was part of the Pulitzer Prize winning team
2017 PEN/John Kenneth Galbraith Award, Long-listed for Nonfiction Prize

Bibliography
 Home Before Dark (1948)
 Looking For Work (1979)
 A Handsome Man (1981)
 The Cage (1982)
 Doctors & Women (1987)
 Elizabeth Cole (1989)
 Treetops: A Memoir About Raising Wonderful Children in an Imperfect World (1991)
 A Woman's Life: The Story of an Ordinary American and Her Extroardinary Generation (1994)
 Jrnls John Cheever #1 (1995)
 Not Found in a Bottle (1999)
 My Name is Bill: Bill Wilson-- His Life and the Creation of Alcoholics Anonymous (2004)
 American Bloomsbury: Louisa May Alcott, Ralph Waldo Emerson, Margaret Fuller, Nathaniel Hawthorne, and Henry David Thoreau - Their Lives, Their Loves, Their Work (2006)
 Desire: Where Sex Meets Addiction (2008)
 E.E. Cummings: A Life (2014)
 Drinking in America: Our Secret Society (2016)

References

External links

Susan Cheever official website
Column archive at The Daily Beast

Bad Girls: 26 Writers Misbehave includes "Alma Mater", an essay by Susan Cheever (2007)
The Other Woman: Twenty-one Wives, Lovers, and Others Talk Openly About Sex, Deception, Love, and Betrayal includes "In Praise of Married Men," an essay by Susan Cheever (2007)

20th-century American novelists
American biographers
Pembroke College in Brown University alumni
Brown University alumni
1943 births
Living people
The New School faculty
American memoirists
Place of birth missing (living people)
21st-century American novelists
American women novelists
20th-century American women writers
21st-century American women writers
Novelists from New York (state)
20th-century American non-fiction writers
21st-century American non-fiction writers
American women memoirists
American women academics